State Route 361 (SR 361), Gabbs Valley Road, is a  state highway in Mineral, Nye, and Churchill counties in Nevada, United States. The highway serves the town of Gabbs following Gabbs Valley Road through the extreme northwestern tip of Nye County. Gabbs is isolated from the rest of the county, requiring travel on SR 361 through other counties in order to reach any other major town in Nye County. SR 361 was previously known as State Route 23.

Route description

From there, the highway heads north towards the mountains of the Gabbs Valley Range. The route curves sharply east to climb up to Calavada Summit (elevation ), and then turns northward again to pass over Petrified Summit (elevation ) before leaving the mountain range. Route 361 then heads northeast, entering Gabbs Valley and Nye County as it approaches the town of Gabbs.

As the highway heads out of Gabbs it intersects State Route 844, providing access to the Berlin-Ichthyosaur State Park and Ione via the Humboldt-Toiyabe National Forest. SR 361 continues north from here, reentering Mineral County briefly before entering Churchill County. The route comes to an end at an intersection with U.S. Route 50 at Middlegate.

History

The general routing of present-day SR 361 first appeared on state highway maps in 1929 as an unpaved road, State Route 23.  By 1939, the portion of the route in Mineral and Nye Counties had been realigned further east.  The final alignment of SR 23, shown as a paved highway, was in place by 1946.

The route remained relatively unchanged until the 1976 renumbering of Nevada's highway system.  On July 1, the SR 23 designation was replaced by State Route 361.  This change was first seen on the 1978–79 edition of the official highway map.

Major intersections
Note: Mileposts in Nevada reset at county lines. The start and end mileposts for each county are given in the county column.

References

External links

361
Transportation in Churchill County, Nevada
Transportation in Mineral County, Nevada
Transportation in Nye County, Nevada